Monika Veselovski (Serbian Cyrillic: Моника Веселовски; born December 1, 1977) is a Serbian female professional basketball player.

External links
Profile at Eurobasket.com

1977 births
Living people
Basketball players from Novi Sad
Serbian expatriate basketball people in Bosnia and Herzegovina
Serbian expatriate basketball people in Croatia
Serbian expatriate basketball people in Cyprus
Serbian expatriate basketball people in Israel
Serbian expatriate basketball people in Italy
Serbian expatriate basketball people in Montenegro
Serbian expatriate basketball people in Poland
Serbian women's basketball players
Shooting guards
ŽKK Spartak Subotica players